Manila Science High School
is a public science high school in the Philippines. It is located on Taft Avenue at the corner of Padre Faura Street in Ermita, Manila, and was established on October 1, 1963, as the first science high school in the Philippines.

History 

Ramon Magsaysay, the 7th President of the Philippines, was the first to envision a Science High School in the Philippines in his 1956 State of the Nation Address where he underscored the great need of stepping up the development of fundamental and applied research in science and technology which has "long been neglected."

Taking action, the Philippine Congress passed Republic Act 1606, creating the National Science Board, composed of representatives from the following institutions: the National Research Council of the Philippines, the University of the Philippines, the Science Foundation of the Philippines, the Institute of Science and Technology, the Philippine Association for the Advancement of Science, the Philippine Confederation of Professional Organizations, the Department of Agriculture and Natural Resources (now the departments of Agriculture and Environment and Natural Resources), the Department of Health, the Department of Commerce and Industry (now the Department of Trade and Industry), various manufacturing industries, and the National Economic Council. 

This was closely followed by Republic Act 2067, known as the Science Act of 1958, which proposed to integrate, coordinate, and intensify scientific and technological research and development to foster invention, whilst also renaming the board as the National Science Development Board (now known as the Department of Science and Technology).

In conjunction, the Department of Education implemented Republic Act 1606 by issuing Department Orders 1 and 5, series of 1958, for the launching of Science Talent Research.

November 25, 1959, marked the start of the school's journey. With 36 students screened through a competitive examination, this nucleus of a science high school had its beginnings in a single-story building in Intramuros. In its second year, this nucleus was called the Special Science Class. March 28, 1963, witnessed each of the 32 graduates of the Special Science Class receive a gold medal. It was the first time in the history of Philippine education wherein each member of the graduating class was a gold medalist.

On October 1, 1963, Manila Science High School was born by virtue of Municipal Resolution 426 signed by Mayor Antonio J. Villegas. Credit for the school's early success goes to then Manila High School Principal Augusto Alzona – the "Father of Manila Science High School". Modeled after the Bronx High School of Science, the special science curriculum was designed to meet the needs of scholars gifted in science and mathematics. However, opportunities, training, and experiences in varied fields were also made available.

After five years in Intramuros, the school moved to its present site in 1966 with its first principal, Honesto Valdez (1963–1977). By 1977, Phase I of the Main Building was completed while the construction of Phase II was still ongoing.

In September 1977, Evelina P. Barotilla (1977–1988), the second principal, saw the completion of the Manila Science High School Complex and the renovation of the H.A. Bordner Building. The Home Economics Building was built in 1980. The whole construction project was financed by the Special Education Fund under the chairmanship of Dr. Josefina Navarro, Superintendent of City Schools, Manila.

From 1988 until 2002, Manila Science High School was further sharpened under the supervision of Daisy H. Banta. Her leadership saw the completion of the Computer Science building; she also spearheaded the School of the Future program, and the French language program.

The new millennium ushered in the arrival of Susan A. Yano, fourth principal, the completion of the Antonio Maceda Building, and the revival of the Manila Science High School Alumni Association. Mrs. Susan A. Yano opted for early retirement. Edna P. Parcon, Math Department Head III, was then assigned Officer-in-Charge from July 18, 2002, to January 13, 2003, together with Ms. Betty de la Cruz, Science Supervisor, assigned Supervisor-in-Charge from October 13, 2002, to January 13, 2003. Rosita C. Herson became the principal in 2003 until 2006. After that, Manila Science High School was under the leadership of Salud S. Sabado from 2006 until November 15, 2008.

Manila Science High School had been under the leadership of Flora A. Valdez for less than a year until her retirement on January 21, 2010. 
Before her retirement, a government project was started: the construction of the Amadome by Manila 5th District Congressman Amado Bagatsing, completed in time for the new school year, being formally inaugurated and turned over by Cong. Bagatsing on September 8, 2010.

Due to the implementation of laws for the May 2010 polls, Manila Science did not have a principal until such time that the elected Mayor of Manila appointed new school administrators. 

The school, during the last half of SY 2009-2010 and on the first quarter of SY 2010–2011, was under the leadership of Edna P. Parcon, the school's Mathematics Department Head until August 26, 2010, which welcomed the arrival of the seventh principal Fernando B. Orines.

A groundbreaking ceremony for the construction of a 10-storey building with a roof deck was held on July 26, 2021. The new building will occupy a 3,690.80 square meter lot on the site of the main building and the Antonio Maceda building. Each floor will cover 2,466.88 m2 and have two offices. There will be five elevators, each with a 24-person capacity. All of the 158 classrooms — each measuring 168 m2 — will be fully airconditioned. Other planned facilities for the new building include a 189 m2 library, a 270 m2 canteen, a 459 m2 auditorium, a 777 m2 gymnasium and a 1,187.56 m2 outdoor sports arena.

On November 4, 2022, Mr. Manolo G. Peña was welcomed as the 13th principal, succeeding the now-retiring 12th principal of the school, Dr. Ligaya G. Quides.

Notable alumni 

 Cristeta Pasia Comerford (Class 1979)
Culinary artist and chief cook for the White House.  The first woman appointed in the position and the first of Filipino descent.
 Von Glenn Hernandez (Class 1983)
Environmental activist and 2003 Goldman Environmental Prize winner
 Alvin Patrimonio (Class 1983) 
Professional basketball player, four-time Most Valuable Player of the Philippine Basketball Association.
 Beethoven V. Bunagan (Class 1986) 
a.k.a. Michael V., Philippine actor, composer, singer and parodist.
 Reev Robledo (Class 1993)
Music composer, songwriter, teacher and author. He has written various TV themes for networks ABS-CBN, GMA, TV5, JackTV and the Velvet Channel.
 Marizel Sarangelo (Class 1997)
a.k.a Tuesday Vargas, Philippine singer, comedian and Talentadong Pinoy talent scout.

 Louie Mar Gangcuangco (Class 2003)
Author of the best-selling Filipino novel Orosa-Nakpil, Malate; homosexuality, HIV-AIDS and gay literature activist

References

External links

Official Website
50th Year Anniversary Documentary
MaSci Alumni Foundation Website 

Science high schools in Manila
Science high schools in Metro Manila
Education in Ermita
Educational institutions established in 1963
1963 establishments in the Philippines
Public schools in Metro Manila